Robert Coles may refer to:
 Robert Coles (settler) (c. 1600–1655), early American settler
 Robert Coles (psychiatrist) (born 1929), American author and psychiatrist
 Robert Coles (golfer) (born 1972), English golfer

See also 
 Robert Cole (disambiguation)
 Coles (disambiguation)
 Robert T. Coles House and Studio, a historic home and design studio in Buffalo, Erie County, New York, US